The 2018 Tour de Suisse was a road cycling stage race that took place between 9 and 17 June 2018 in Switzerland. It was the 82nd edition of the Tour de Suisse and the twenty-fourth event of the 2018 UCI World Tour.

Route

Teams
As the Tour de Suisse is a UCI World Tour event, all eighteen UCI WorldTeams were invited automatically and obliged to enter a team in the race. Three UCI Professional Continental teams competed, completing the 21-team peloton.

Stages

Stage 1
10 June 2018 — Frauenfeld to Frauenfeld,  (TTT)

Stage 2
10 June 2018 — Frauenfeld to Frauenfeld,

Stage 3
11 June 2018 — Oberstammheim to Gansingen,

Stage 4
12 June 2018 — Gansingen to Gstaad,

Stage 5
13 June 2018 — Gstaad to Leukerbad,

Stage 6
14 June 2018 — Fiesch to Gommiswald,

Stage 7
15 June 2018 — Eschenbach to Arosa,

Stage 8
16 June 2018 — Bellinzona to Bellinzona,

Stage 9
17 June 2018 — Bellinzona to Bellinzona,  Individual time trial

Classification leadership table
In the Tour de Suisse, four different jerseys were awarded. The general classification was calculated by adding each cyclist's finishing times on each stage, and allowing time bonuses for the first three finishers at intermediate sprints (three seconds to first, two seconds to second and one second to third) and at the finish of mass-start stages; these were awarded to the first three finishers on all stages except for the individual time trial: the stage winner won a ten-second bonus, with six and four seconds for the second and third riders respectively. The leader of the classification received a yellow jersey; it was considered the most important of the 2017 Tour de Suisse, and the winner of the classification was considered the winner of the race.

Additionally, there was a points classification, which awarded a black jersey. In the points classification, cyclists received points for finishing in the top 5 in a stage. For winning a stage, a rider earned 10 points, with 8 for second, 6 for third, 4 for fourth and 2 for 5th place. Points towards the classification could also be accrued – awarded on a 6–3–1 scale – at intermediate sprint points during each stage; these intermediate sprints also offered bonus seconds towards the general classification as noted above.

There was also a mountains classification, the leadership of which was marked by a blue jersey. In the mountains classification, points towards the classification were won by reaching the top of a climb before other cyclists. Each climb was categorised as either hors, first, second, or third-category, with more points available for the higher-categorised climbs.

The fourth and final jersey represented the classification for Swiss riders, marked by a red jersey. This was decided the same way as the general classification, but only riders born in Switzerland were eligible to be ranked in the classification. There was also a classification for teams, in which the times of the best three cyclists per team on each stage were added together; the leading team at the end of the race was the team with the lowest total time. In addition, there was a combativity award given after each stage to the rider considered, by a jury, to have been most active, or in the case of the individual time trials, the stage winner was automatically deemed the most active rider.

References

Sources

 

2018 UCI World Tour
2018 in Swiss sport
2018
June 2018 sports events in Switzerland